Martin John Christopher Freeman (born 8 September 1971) is an English actor. Among other accolades, he has won an Emmy Award, a BAFTA Award and a Screen Actors Guild Award, and has been nominated for a Golden Globe Award.

Freeman's most notable roles are that of Tim Canterbury in the mockumentary series The Office (2001–2003), Dr. John Watson in the British crime drama series Sherlock (2010–2017), young Bilbo Baggins in The Hobbit film trilogy (2012–2014), and Lester Nygaard in the first season of the dark comedy-crime drama series Fargo (2014). He has also appeared in films including the romantic comedy Love Actually (2003), the horror comedy Shaun of the Dead (2004), the sci-fi comedy The Hitchhiker's Guide to the Galaxy (2005), the action comedy Hot Fuzz (2007), the semi-improvised comedy Nativity! (2009), the sci-fi comedy The World's End (2013), and as Everett K. Ross in the Marvel Cinematic Universe superhero films Captain America: Civil War (2016), Black Panther (2018), and Black Panther: Wakanda Forever (2022). He will reprise the role in the upcoming Disney+ series Secret Invasion (2023).

Early life
Martin John Christopher Freeman was born on 8 September 1971 in Aldershot, Hampshire, the youngest of five children. 

His parents, Philomena (née Norris) and naval officer Geoffrey Freeman, separated when he was a child. His father died of a heart attack when Freeman was 10 years old. 

Freeman's paternal grandfather, Leonard W. Freeman, was a medic in the British Expeditionary Force during World War II and was killed in action at Dunkirk just a few days before the Dunkirk evacuation. 

Leonard's father, Richard, was born blind and worked as a piano tuner and organist at St Andrew's Church in West Tarring before becoming a music teacher in Kingston upon Hull. 

Freeman was raised in his mother's Catholic faith, and attended the Salesian School in Chertsey, Surrey, before attending Brooklands College in nearby Weybridge for media studies. His older brother, Tim, became a singer with the group Frazier Chorus.

Career

Freeman attended the Central School of Speech and Drama and has appeared in at least 18 TV shows, 14 theatre productions, and several radio productions. He is notable for his role as Tim Canterbury in The Office (2001–2003), a role which, he said in 2004, "cast a very long shadow" for him as an actor. He appeared in the sitcom Hardware (2003–2004). He also appeared in several films, including Ali G Indahouse (2002) and Love Actually (2003).

Freeman began to move into more serious dramatic roles on television with his appearance as Lord Shaftesbury in the 2003 BBC historical drama Charles II: The Power and The Passion. He can also be seen making a brief appearance in the first episode of the second series of This Life. Freeman also starred in the BBC television series The Robinsons and had a cameo in Episode 1 of Black Books. In 2007, he appeared in The All Together written and directed by Gavin Claxton, as well as the Bill Kenwright theatre production of The Last Laugh. Freeman is featured in the video for Faith No More's cover of "I Started a Joke". In May 2009, he starred in Boy Meets Girl, a four-part drama that charts the progress of characters Veronica and Danny after an accident which causes them to swap bodies.

Freeman played Dr. John Watson in Sherlock, the BBC contemporary adaptation of the Sherlock Holmes detective stories. The first episode of Sherlock, "A Study in Pink", was broadcast on 25 July 2010 to critical acclaim. For his performance in the role, he won the 2011 BAFTA award for Best Supporting Actor and the Primetime Emmy Award for Outstanding Supporting Actor in a Miniseries or a Movie.

Freeman played Bilbo Baggins, the main character, in the three-part Peter Jackson's The Hobbit film series. Accolades that his performance in the first part, The Hobbit: An Unexpected Journey, garnered him include Best Hero at the 2013 MTV Movie Awards and Best Actor at the 18th Empire Awards.

Freeman appeared in all three films of Simon Pegg and Edgar Wright's comedic Three Flavours Cornetto trilogy, commencing with a brief non-speaking role in Shaun of the Dead as Yvonne's boyfriend, Declan, followed by a brief cameo in Hot Fuzz as a police officer. He was a main cast member in the 2013 finale to the trilogy, The World's End. On 5 October 2013, he was presented with a fellowship bearing his name by the members of University College Dublin's Literary & Historical Society. In April 2014, he played insurance salesman Lester Nygaard in the dark comedy-crime drama series Fargo. For his performance in this series, he was nominated for a Primetime Emmy Award, a Golden Globe Award, and a Critics' Choice Television Award. He opened in the title role in Shakespeare’s play Richard III in July 2014 at Trafalgar Studios.

In 2015, Freeman starred as producer Milton Fruchtman in the television film The Eichmann Show, based on blacklisted TV director Leo Hurwitz's filming of the 1961 trial of Nazi war criminal Adolf Eichmann. The film intercut dramatic scenes with historical footage from the trial. The Daily Telegraph described the film as "absolutely enthralling". He also played Everett K. Ross, a Central Intelligence Agency agent in Captain America: Civil War, which was released in May 2016.

In 2017, Freeman starred in Cargo, which premiered at the Adelaide Film Festival on 6 August 2017. The film is a feature-length remake of a 2013 short film of the same name. Later in the year he appeared opposite Tamsin Greig in Labour of Love, a political comedy by James Graham, at the Noël Coward Theatre. Labour of Love charts both the evolution of the UK Labour Party in recent decades and its presence in a tight-knit Nottinghamshire community. Freeman portrays fictional Labour MP David Lyons, whose modernising ideas pit him against the traditional left-wing constituency agent Jean Whittaker (Greig).

In 2018, he reprised his role as Everett K. Ross in Black Panther, which was set around two weeks after the event in Captain America: Civil War, making it his second appearance in Marvel Cinematic Universe. Between May 2017 and July 2019, Freeman starred in numerous adverts for Vodafone.

In June 2018, Freeman was part of To Provide All People, a BBC Wales drama celebrating 70 years of the National Health Service.

Since March 2020, Freeman has starred in the FX/Sky One comedy series Breeders. Freeman also serves as creator and an executive producer for the series. On 18 May 2020 FX and Sky One renewed Breeders for a second season.

Charity work
In 2011, Freeman umpired a charity cricket match to raise money for victims of the Christchurch earthquake.

Personal life
Freeman resides in the Belsize Park area of London. He previously lived in Potters Bar, Hertfordshire, with actress Amanda Abbington. They were together from 2000 to 2016, and have a son named Joe and a daughter named Grace. They appeared together in productions such as Sherlock, Swinging with the Finkels, The Debt, The Robinsons, and The All Together. On 22 December 2016, it was reported that Freeman and Abbington had separated. He is a vegetarian and is no longer a practising Catholic. He is a close friend of actor Simon Pegg, who is the godfather of his son.

Freeman's personal style follows that of British mod subculture, and he cites Paul Weller as one of his heroes and influences on his style. He is a fan of soul, Motown, and jazz music, and presented an episode of BBC Two's The Culture Show in 2009 titled "Martin Freeman Goes to Motown". He also selected music for a 2006 Motown compilation titled Made to Measure, and worked on a jazz compilation with his friend Eddie Piller titled Jazz on the Corner, which was released on Acid Jazz Records on 23 March 2018 and featured tracks by Kamasi Washington and The Brand New Heavies. The pair presented Craig Charles' Funk and Soul Show on 31 March 2018. In 2019, a follow-up album titled Soul on the Corner was announced, featuring tracks by Leroy Hutson and Bobby Womack.

Freeman's brother, singer-songwriter Jamie Freeman, died of brain cancer in December 2022.

Politics
Freeman is a supporter of the Labour Party. As a teenager, he supported the now-defunct political group Militant and volunteered with the Labour Party Young Socialists. In 2015, he appeared in a party political broadcast to endorse the Labour Party ahead of the 2015 UK general election. In August 2015, Freeman was a supporter of Jeremy Corbyn's campaign in the Labour Party leadership election.

Filmography

Film

Television

Awards and nominations

References

External links

1971 births
20th-century English male actors
21st-century English male actors
Living people
Alumni of the Royal Central School of Speech and Drama
Best Supporting Actor BAFTA Award (television) winners
Emmy Award winners
Primetime Emmy Award winners
Outstanding Performance by a Cast in a Motion Picture Screen Actors Guild Award winners
Outstanding Performance by a Supporting Actor in a Miniseries or Movie Primetime Emmy Award winners
British male comedy actors
English male film actors
English male television actors
English male voice actors
English Roman Catholics
English socialists
Male actors from Hampshire
Actors from Aldershot
Labour Party (UK) people